The Jaynagar–Ranchi Express is an Express train belonging to South Eastern Railway zone that runs between  and  in India. It is currently being operated with 18605/18606 train numbers on triweekly basis

Route and halts 

The important halts of the train are:

Coach composition

The train has standard ICF rakes (CBC coupling) with max speed of 110 km/h. The train consists of 16 coaches:

 5 General Unreserved
 6 Sleeper
 1 AC 2Tier 
 2 AC 3Tier
 2 Seating cum Luggage Rake

The train reverses its direction 1 times:

References

External links 

 https://indiarailinfo.com/train/-train-jaynagar-ranchi-express-18605/13986/1813/384
 https://indiarailinfo.com/train/-train-jaynagar-ranchi-express-18606/13986/1813/384

Transport in Jainagar
Transport in Ranchi
Express trains in India
Rail transport in Bihar
Railway services introduced in 2011
South Eastern Railway zone